Talbot Peterson was Chairman of the Republican Party of Wisconsin.

Biography
A native of Appleton, Wisconsin, Peterson was married with two children. His wife, Evelyn, was Vice Chair of the Outagamie County, Wisconsin Republican Party and the Republican Party of Wisconsin.

Career
Peterson chaired the Republican Party of Wisconsin in 1964. He was also a delegate to the Republican National Convention in 1964 and 1972.

References

Politicians from Appleton, Wisconsin
Republican Party of Wisconsin chairs
Year of birth missing
Year of death missing